The 2002 Melbourne Storm season was the 5th in the club's history. They competed in the NRL's 2002 Telstra Premiership and finished the regular season in 10th place making it their lowest finishing position until 2010, when it was sentenced to finish that season last due to gross salary cap breaches. As of 2020, it is also the most recent time that the Storm missed the finals due to not winning enough games. It was Mark Murray's final season as coach of the club.

In 2002 the Storm returned to Olympic Park. The club secured no big name player signings for the season as it kept under the NRL imposed salary cap.

In an effort to reignite its floundering success the return to its smaller home ground was seen by players and supporters as a positive move. The club though continued to deliver hot and cold performances as the season progressed, leaving them on the fringe of the Top 8 (from only 15 competitors).

The club suffered internal turmoil during the season, particularly when the captaincy was removed from Robbie Kearns and given to Rodney Howe. The Storm was also troubled over the renegotiation of club stalwart Richard Swain's contract - he reluctantly signed for Brisbane for 2003 when the Storm (citing salary cap issues) failed to make him an offer.

The Storm's season again came down to needing to win its final round game to reach the semi-finals. In a repeat of 2001, Melbourne appeared to lack enthusiasm when it mattered and again lost a crucial match.

Season Summary
 Pre season – Melbourne officials request to play most of their games at 3pm on Saturday afternoons, which matches broadcast by Nine Melbourne.
 16 February – Melbourne win a scrappy preseason trial match against Wests Tigers 30–18 at Gladstone, with triallist Alf Duncan scoring two tries.
 13 March – Melbourne is fined $90,000 for a breach of the 2001 NRL salary cap, with club officials vowing to fight the penalty.
 Round 1 – Storm defeat Canberra Raiders 16-12 in their return to Olympic Park, a disallowed try for obstruction causing consternation for Raiders' coach Matt Elliott.
 Round 3 – Without regular  Matt Orford, Melbourne thrash North Queensland Cowboys 38-10 with Scott Hill dangerous in attack to ease the pressure on debutant Marty Turner. 
 Round 4 – Melbourne stage a dramatic comeback to end Parramatta Eels 14-game undefeated run at Parramatta Stadium. Storm fight back from a 30-10 half time deficit to win 32-30. The winning try was scored almost on full time as Danny Williams offloaded to Marcus Bai for the er to score in the corner.
 9 April – Michael Russo and Marty Turner are involved in a serious car accident near Geelong, returning from a surfing trip. Turner suffers fractured ribs, a ruptured spleen, severe concussion, and cuts and bruises. Russo escapes with an injured elbow and is able to return to play in Round 6.
 Round 6 – Michael Russo scores a late try to seal a 12-4 win over St George Illawarra Dragons only days after the car accident involving him and Marty Turner. Melbourne were forced to overcome more injuries with third-string  Cameron Smith injured during the game.
 Round 7 – New Zealand Warriors claim the Michael Moore Trophy for the first time, beating Melbourne 20-10.
 9 May – The NRL board confirms Melbourne's salary cap fine of $90,000 will stand.
 Round 10 – Trailing 20-22 with seconds remaining, referee Paul Simpkins awards a penalty against Parramatta Eels for stripping the ball from Willie Leyshon, but Matt Orford missed a late penalty goal, costing Melbourne a point. 
 24 May – Storm CEO Chris Johns admits spreading rumours that the club will relocate to Brisbane in order to extract further funding from the Victorian Government.
 Round 11 – Melbourne slump to a fifth straight defeat, the worst consecutive streak in club history.
 31 May – Head coach Mark Murray makes the decision to dump captain Robbie Kearns, replacing him with Rodney Howe. Senior Melbourne players condemn the decision with Scott Hill suggesting that "senior players should have been consulted." Kearns later calls out the club for disloyalty at the decision to strip him of the captaincy.
 Round 13 – With new captain Rodney Howe carried off with severe concussion in the first 10 minutes, Melbourne fall to their sixth straight defeat. Coach Mark Murray at odds with referee Mark Oaten's 15-6 penalty count and a number of crucial decisions during the game.
 Round 14 –  forward Shane Walker is sent off for a high swinging arm tackle that knocks out St George Illawarra prop forward Jason Ryles. Melbourne gain their first competition point since April, holding out for a 30-all draw.
 16 June – Reports emerge that Melbourne are having difficulty in retaining  Richard Swain.
 Round 15 – Melbourne win their first game in two months, thrashing South Sydney Rabbitohs 44-6 in the first match between the teams since 1999.
 30 June – Negotiations break down between Melbourne and Richard Swain, with the  now free to entertain offers from rival clubs.
 23 July – Melbourne announce that Richard Swain will not be at the club in 2003 after withdrawing any contract offer. Storm announce the signing of Brisbane Broncos rookie Robert Tanielu for 2003, and re-signings of Junior Langi, Kirk Reynoldson, and Cameron Smith.
 24 July – St Gregory's College schoolboys football star Ryan Hoffman signs with the Storm for two years.
 25 July – Canberra Raiders confirm they have signed Storm forward Matt Rua for 2003.
 Round 20 – Due to a jersey clash, Melbourne wear their 1999-2000 gold clash jersey against Penrith Panthers, but are issued with a $3,000 breach notice as the jerseys were missing the Telstra Premiership logos.
 1 August – Brisbane Broncos sign Richard Swain to a one-year contract for 2003.
 Round 26 – Needing a win to sneak into the NRL finals, Melbourne fall short against Canberra Raiders for the second consecutive year in the final round of the season.
 11 September – Mark Murray is sacked as Melbourne coach after missing the finals for the second consecutive season.
 12 September –  Scott Hill claims former coach Mark Murray treated players like school children.
 18 September – Brisbane Broncos performance director Craig Bellamy is appointed new head coach of Melbourne, signing a two-year contract.
 4 October – Chris Johns resigns as Melbourne Storm CEO to return to Queensland, leaving the club after more than five years in Melbourne.

Milestone games

Jerseys

Melbourne's jerseys were again manufactured by Fila and unchanged from the designs worn in 2001. The player names on the backs of jerseys were dropped in favour of front of jersey advertiser Adecco. The quirk of the season came in both round 7 against the New Zealand Warriors and round 20 against Penrith Panthers as due to a jersey clashes, Melbourne wore the 1999-2000 gold jersey. However, the club was subsequently issued with a $3,000 breach notice after the match against Penrith, as the jerseys were missing the Telstra Premiership logos.

Fixtures

Pre season

Regular season

Source:

Ladder

2002 Coaching Staff
Head coach: Mark Murray
Assistant coach: Anthony Griffin
Football Manager: Greg Brentnall
Physical Preparation Coach: Dave Darbyshire
Physiotherapist: Greg Gibson 
Sports Trainer: Troy Thompson
Recruitment manager: Peter O'Sullivan

2002 squad
List current as of 11 August 2021

Player movements

Losses
 Russell Bawden to London Broncos
 Tasesa Lavea to Northern Eagles
 Brett O'Farrell to Released
 Brenton Pomery to Released
 Ben Roarty to Penrith Panthers
 Paul Sheedy to New South Wales Waratahs (rugby)
 Brad Watts to South Sydney Rabbitohs
 Paul Whatuira to Penrith Panthers

Gains
 Alf Duncan from Uncontracted
 William Leyshon from Northern Eagles
 Keith Mason from Wakefield Trinity Wildcats
 Mitchell Sargent from Parramatta Eels
 Ian Sibbit from Warrington Wolves
 Shane Walker from Wests Tigers

Representative honours
This table lists all players who have played a representative match in 2002.

Statistics
This table contains playing statistics for all Melbourne Storm players to have played in the 2002 NRL season. 

Statistics sources:

Scorers

Most points in a game: 18 points
 Round 14 - Matt Orford (2 tries, 5 goals) vs St George Illawarra Dragons

Most tries in a game: 3 
 Round 20 - Aaron Moule vs Penrith Panthers

Winning games

Highest score in a winning game: 48 points 
 Round 18 vs Sydney Roosters

Lowest score in a winning game: 12 points
 Round 6 vs St George Illawarra Dragons

Greatest winning margin: 38 points 
 Round 15 vs South Sydney Rabbitohs
 Round 18 vs Sydney Roosters

Greatest number of games won consecutively: 2
 Round 3 - Round 4
 Round 17 - Round 18
 Round 22 - Round 23

Losing games

Highest score in a losing game: 28 points
 Round 8 vs Newcastle Knights

Lowest score in a losing game: 6 points 
 Round 9 vs Sydney Roosters

Greatest losing margin: 28 points
 Round 9 vs Sydney Roosters
 Round 21 vs Brisbane Broncos

Greatest number of games lost consecutively: 6 
 Round 7 - Round 13

Feeder Team
Melbourne Storm reserve players again travelled to Brisbane each week to play with Queensland Cup team Norths Devils. Terry Matterson took over the coaching role with Mark Murray and Anthony Griffin making the move to Melbourne in 2001. Making the finals for the fifth straight season, Norths Devils finished fifth, and won through to the preliminary final of the 2002 Queensland Cup. Melbourne Storm rookie Cameron Smith won the Devils Player of the Year Award.

Awards and honours

Melbourne Storm Awards Night
 Melbourne Storm Player of the Year: Rodney Howe 
 Melbourne Storm Rookie of the year: Michael Russo  
 Melbourne Storm Clubman of the Year: Matt Geyer  
Mick Moore Chairman's Award: Chris Johns

Notes

References

Melbourne Storm seasons
Melbourne Storm season